And Once Again may refer to:

 ...And Once Again, a 2010 Indian family drama film
 And Once Again (album), a 1980 album by Isaac Hayes